Japanorama is a series of documentaries presented by Jonathan Ross, exploring various facets of popular culture and trends of modern-day Japan.

Each episode has a theme, around which Ross presents cultural phenomenon, films, music, and art that exemplify facets of Japan. The series is colourful in both its creative use of subject matter, and its use of bright colours that helped accent the action on screen rather than distract from it. Subjects are separated by eye catches that often featured the artwork of Junko Mizuno. Ross hosted each episode in suits so bright and stylised they could have been stolen from an anime character.

Fans have praised the series for the care that both Ross and the BBC have placed in its production. Time was given to delve into each subject, and he was able to interview various figureheads of culture and industry, including Mamoru Oshii, Hayao Miyazaki, Takeshi Kitano, Takashi Miike, Takashi Murakami, and Sonny Chiba.

The theme song of the show was Kiyoshi no zundoko bushi by Kiyoshi Hikawa.

Series and episode list

Japanorama consisted of three series, each with six episodes. The first series was shown on BBC Choice in 2002, while series 2 and 3 were shown on BBC Three in 2006 and 2007 respectively.

Series 1

Series 2

Series 3

See also
 Japan TV, a similar programme by BBC Choice, broadcast in August 2000 and June 2001
 Adam and Joe Go Tokyo, an eight-part 2003 series examining life in Tokyo, produced by Jonathan Ross
 Asian Invasion, a 2006 mini-series with Jonathan Ross talking about the cinema of Japan, Hong Kong and Korea

Notes

References

External links

Japanese popular culture
BBC television documentaries
UKTV original programming
2000s British documentary television series
2002 British television series debuts
2007 British television series endings